The spiky oreo (Neocyttus rhomboidalis) is an oreo of the genus Neocyttus, found in all southern oceans at depths of between 200 and 1,300 m.  Its length is up to 40 cm.

References
 
 Tony Ayling & Geoffrey Cox, Collins Guide to the Sea Fishes of New Zealand,  (William Collins Publishers Ltd, Auckland, New Zealand 1982) 

Oreosomatidae
Fish described in 1906